Carphephorus paniculatus, commonly known as the hairy chaffhead, is a species of flowering plant native to parts of the southeastern United States. A perennial dicot, it reaches a height of 3 feet.

References

Eupatorieae
Flora of the Southeastern United States
Flora without expected TNC conservation status